Junggye Station is a station on the Seoul Subway Line 7. Its name comes from Junggye-dong, where it is located, and means "in the middle of Hancheon".

Station layout

References 

Metro stations in Nowon District
Seoul Metropolitan Subway stations
Railway stations opened in 1996